The Committee for Agriculture, Environment and Rural Affairs was established in Northern Ireland to advise and assist the Minister for Agriculture and Rural Development, on matters within her responsibility as a Minister. The committee undertakes a scrutiny, policy development and consultation role with respect to the Department of Agriculture, Environment and Rural Affairs and plays a key role in the consideration and development of legislation.

Until 2016, the committee was called the Committee for Agriculture and Rural Development.

Membership (9)

See also
Department of Agriculture, Environment and Rural Affairs

References

External links
Committee for Agriculture and Rural Development

Northern Ireland Assembly